Berlin-Jerusalem (Hebrew: ברלין ירושלים, tr. Berlin Yerushalayim) is an 89-minute 1989 British-Dutch-French-Israeli-Italian English-, French-, German-, and Hebrew-language independent underground dramatic historical experimental art film directed by Amos Gitai.

Synopsis
The film tells the story of two women in the 1930s. The first, Else Lasker-Schüler (Lisa Kreuzer), a German expressionist poet, observes the rise of Nazism in Berlin before leaving for Jerusalem. The second, the Russian Manya Shochat (Rivka Neumann), called Tania in the film, settles in a community in Israel.

Production

Reception

The film was screened at the 46th Venice International Film Festival during September 1989 (where it won several awards and was nominated for the Golden Lion), at the 1990 International Istanbul Film Festival/ (where it also won several awards) and International Film Festival Rotterdam, at the British Film Institute’s 1989 BFI London Film Festival, at the 1989 Toronto International Film Festival on 13 September 1989, at the 42nd Berlin International Film Festival on 22 February 1992, and at the 1998 São Paulo International Film Festival. The journalist Daniel Warth has opined that “although the film is minimalistic, it is nonetheless ravishing.” The film was released in Israel, where it was released to the general public by ’s  and the Tel Aviv Cinematheque on 7 December 1990 (the film was released on 14 March 1990 in France and on 13 December 1991 in the Netherlands), together with Esther (1986) as part of a DVD boxset in 2005.

References

Sources

External links
Berlin-Jerusalem at Amos Gitai's Official Website

1989 films
1980s English-language films
1980s French-language films
1980s German-language films
1980s avant-garde and experimental films
1980s biographical drama films
1980s historical drama films
1989 independent films
1980s political drama films
Biographical films about politicians
Biographical films about poets
British avant-garde and experimental films
British biographical drama films
British historical drama films
British independent films
British political drama films
Cultural depictions of German women
Cultural depictions of Israeli women
Cultural depictions of politicians
Cultural depictions of Russian women
Cultural depictions of writers
Dutch avant-garde and experimental films
Dutch biographical drama films
Dutch historical drama films
Dutch independent films
Drama films based on actual events
Films about Nazis
Films about refugees
Films directed by Amos Gitai
Films set in Berlin
Films set in Jerusalem
Films set in the 1930s
Films shot in Berlin
Films shot in Israel
French avant-garde and experimental films
French biographical drama films
French historical drama films
French independent films
French political drama films
1980s Hebrew-language films
Films about immigration
Israeli avant-garde and experimental films
Israeli biographical drama films
Israeli historical drama films
Israeli independent films
1980s British films
1980s French films